Legacy of Darkness may refer to:
 Castlevania: Legacy of Darkness, a video game for the Nintendo 64
 A booster set for the Yu-Gi-Oh! Trading Card Game